Krempachy , is a village in the administrative district of Gmina Nowy Targ, within Nowy Targ County, Lesser Poland Voivodeship, in southern Poland.

The village has a population of 1,200.

It is one of the 14 villages in the Polish part of the historical region of Spiš (Polish: Spisz). It was probably established in the 14th century but was first mentioned in a written document in 1439.

References

Villages in Nowy Targ County
Spiš
Kraków Voivodeship (1919–1939)